Anton Yevgenevich Shenfeld (Шенфельд Антон Евгеньевич, born July 23, 1993) is a Russian professional ice hockey player. He is currently an unrestricted free agent who most recently playing with Metallurg Novokuznetsk of the Supreme Hockey League (VHL).

Shenfeld made his Kontinental Hockey League (KHL) debut playing with Metallurg Magnitogorsk during the 2012–13 KHL season.

After helping contribute to Metallurg claiming the Gagarin Cup in 2014, Shenfeld was traded in order for more opportunity to HC Lada Togliatti on July 4, 2014. He played in three seasons with Lada before returning to Magnitogorsk.

References

External links

1993 births
Living people
HC Lada Togliatti players
Metallurg Magnitogorsk players
Metallurg Novokuznetsk players
Russian ice hockey forwards
HC Sibir Novosibirsk players
Torpedo Nizhny Novgorod players
People from Magnitogorsk
Sportspeople from Chelyabinsk Oblast